Fredrik Bergström may refer to:

 Fredrik Bergström (badminton) (born 1975), Swedish badminton player
 Fredrik Bergström (sailor) (born 1990), Swedish sailor